The  was a rail line of a Japanese minor private railway, Kōnan Railway in Aomori Prefecture, from Kawabe Station in Inakadate to Kuroishi Station in Kuroishi.

Route data 
Kōnan Railway Company
Total distance: 6.2 km (Kawabe - Kuroishi) (6.6 km before 1984)
Rail Gauge: 1067mm
Stations: 3 
Tracks: Single-track
Electrification: None
Block system: Automatic block system

Station list 
Kawabe
Maedayashiki
Kuroishi

Railway lines in Japan
Railway lines opened in 1912
1067 mm gauge railways in Japan
Railway lines closed in 1998
1912 establishments in Japan